A carriage dog or coach dog refers to a type of dog rather than a specific breed. Dogs of this type were usually bred and trained to trot alongside carriages to protect the occupants from banditry or other interference. They were usually owned and used by the wealthy or traders and merchants. The dogs were trained to attack the horses used by highwaymen, giving the owners' human security time to respond to the actual robbers.

When the Dalmatian breed was introduced to England in the 18th century, they quickly became the carriage-dog breed of choice. Because of this, "carriage dog" became synonymous with "Dalmatian". The British Carriage Dog Society exists to preserve "the working heritage of the Dalmatian as a coaching dog." Previously any breed with long legs and some weight in the body had been used.

The number of dogs accompanying any coach could be an indicator of the occupants' wealth or status: some well-situated people would run six or eight dogs.

Coach dogs were kennelled in the stables, and bonded with the horses as pups. They were trained to regard strange horses on the road as hostile, and it was up to the human security to ensure other riders were warned to stay clear of the coach on the road. A more civic usage was as fire-engine escorts, helping to clear the way in crowded streets as well as guarding the very expensive horses in their stables.

With the demise of horse-drawn transport, the need for the dogs declined, and they became largely ceremonial assets, but were often repurposed as static house and barn guard dogs. Today carriage dogs are valued as loyal pets and companions.

References 

Dog roles